Each "article" in this category is a collection of entries about several stamp issuers, presented in alphabetical order. The entries are formulated on the micro model and so provide summary information about all known issuers.

See the :Category:Compendium of postage stamp issuers page for details of the project.

Scarpanto 

Refer 	Karpathos

Schleswig 

Dates 	1864 – 1868
Capital 	Schleswig
Currency 	16 schilling = 1 mark

Refer 	German States

Schleswig-Holstein 

Dates 	1850 – 1868
Capital 	Kiel
Currency 	16 schilling = 1 mark

Refer 	German States

Schweizer-Renecke 

Dates 	1900 only
Capital 	Schweizer-Renecke
Currency 	12 pence = 1 shilling; 20 shillings = 1 pound

Refer 	Transvaal

Scinde 

Dates 	1852 – 1854
Currency 	12 pies = 1 anna; 16 annas = 1 rupee

Refer 	Indian Native States

Scotland 

Dates 	1958 –
Capital 	Edinburgh
Currency 	(1958) 12 pence = 1 shilling; 20 shillings = 1 pound
		(1971) 100 pence = 1 pound

Refer 	Great Britain (Regional Issues)

Scott Expedition 

Refer 	Victoria Land

Scutari (Italian Post Office) 

Dates 	1909 – 1915
Currency 	40 paras = 1 piastre

Refer 	Italian Post Offices in the Turkish Empire

SDD 

Refer 	Dodecanese Islands (Greek Occupation)

Seiyun 

Refer 	Kathiri State of Seiyun

Selangor 

Dates 	1881 –
Capital 	Kuala Lumpur
Currency 	100 cents = 1 dollar

Main Article Needed 

See also 	Malaysia

Semyonov Regime 

Refer 	Ataman Semyonov Regime (Transbaikal)

Senegal 

Dates 	1960 –
Capital 	Dakar
Currency 	100 centimes = 1 franc

Main Article Needed 

Includes 	Senegal (French Colony)

See also 	French West Africa;
		Mali Federation

Senegal (French Colony) 

Dates 	1887 –
Capital 	Dakar
Currency 	100 centimes = 1 franc

Refer 	Senegal

Senegambia & Niger 

Dates 	1903 – 1906
Capital 	Dakar
Currency 	100 centimes = 1 franc

Refer 	French Soudan

Serbia 

Dates 	1866 – 1920; 2006 – 
Capital 	Belgrade
Currency 	100 paras = 1 dinar

Main Article Postage stamps and postal history of Serbia

Includes 	Serbia (Yugoslav Regional Issues)

See also 	Yugoslavia

Serbia (Austrian Occupation) 

Dates 	1916 only
Currency 	100 heller = 1 krone

Refer 	Austro–Hungarian Military Post

Serbia (German Occupation) 

Dates 	1941 – 1944
Currency 	100 paras = 1 dinar

Refer 	German Occupation Issues (WW2)

Serbia (Yugoslav Regional Issues) 

Dates 	1944 – 1946
Capital 	Belgrade
Currency 	100 filler = 1 pengo

Refer 	Serbia

Serbian Occupation Issues 

Main Article Needed 

Includes 	Baranya (Serbian Occupation);
		Hungary (Serbian Occupation);
		Temesvar (Serbian Occupation)

Serbia & Montenegro 

Dates 	2003 – 2006
Capital 	Belgrade
Currency 	100 paras = 1 dinar

Main Article Needed 

See also 	Montenegro
		Serbia;
		Yugoslavia;

Seychelles 

Dates 	1890 –
Capital 	Victoria
Currency 	100 cents = 1 rupee

Main Article Postage stamps and postal history of Seychelles

See also 	British Indian Ocean Territory;
		Zil Elwannyen Sesel

Seychelles Outer Islands 

Refer 	Zil Elwannyen Sesel

Shackleton Expedition 

Refer 	King Edward VII Land

Shahpura 

Dates 	1914 – 1920
Capital 	
Currency 	12 pies = 1 anna; 16 annas = 1 rupee

Refer 	Indian Native States

Shanghai 

Dates 	1865 – 1898
Currency 	(1865) 10 cash = 1 candareen, 100 candareens = 1 tael
		(1890) 100 cents = 1 dollar

Main Article Needed 

See also 	Chinese Empire

Shanghai (US Postal Agency) 

Dates 	1919 – 1922
Currency 	100 cents = 1 dollar

Refer 	US Post Abroad

Sharjah 

Issues of 1968–72 were non-postal and are unrecognised.

Dates 	1963 – 1968
Currency 	(1963) 100 naye paise = 1 rupee
		(1966) 100 dirhams = 1 riyal.

Refer 	Trucial States

Shensi-Kansu-Ninghsia 

Dates 	1946 – 1949
Currency 	100 cents = 1 dollar

Refer 	CPR Regional Issues

Sherifian Post 

Dates 	1912 – 1919
Currency 	400 moussonats = 1 rial

Refer 	Morocco

Shihr & Mukalla 

Refer 	Qu'Aiti State of Shihr & Mukalla

Shqip– 

Prefix denoting Albania.  Stamps use various suffixes.

Refer 	Albania

SHS 

Refer 	Srba Hrvata Slovena

Siam 

Dates 	1883 – 1939
Capital 	Bangkok
Currency (1883) 32 solot = 16 atts = 8 sio = 4 sik = 2 fuang = 1 salung;
			     4 salungs = 1 tical
		(1909) 100 satangs = 1 tical
		(1912) 100 satangs = 1 baht

Refer 	Thailand

Siam (Thailand) 

Dates 	1947 – 1950
Capital 	Bangkok
Currency 	100 satangs = 1 baht

Refer 	Thailand

Siam (British Post Offices) 

Refer 	Bangkok (British Post Office)

Siberia 

Refer 	Russian Civil War Issues

Siberia (Czechoslovak Army) 

Dates 	1919 – 1920
Currency 	100 kopecks = 1 Russian ruble

Refer 	Russian Civil War Issues

Sicily 

Dates 	1859 – 1860
Capital 	Palermo
Currency 	100 grana = 1 ducato

Refer 	Italian States

Sierra Leone 

Dates 	1859 –
Capital 	Freetown
Currency 	(1859) 12 pence = 1 shilling; 20 shillings = 1 pound
		(1964) 100 cents = 1 rupee

Main Article Postage stamps and postal history of Sierra Leone

Sikkim 

Unofficial issues only.

Refer 	India

Silesia 

Refer 	East Silesia;
		Upper Silesia

Simi 

Refer 	Syme

Sind 

Refer 	Scinde

Singapore 

Dates 	1948 –
Capital 	Singapore
Currency 	100 cents = 1 dollar

Main Article Postage stamps and postal history of Singapore

Sinkiang 

Within Sinkiang province was the short-lived Ili Republic, which issued some unofficial stamps 1945–49.

Dates 	1915 – 1949
Currency 	100 cents = 1 dollar

Refer 	Chinese Provinces

Sirmoor 

Dates 	1879 – 1902
Currency 	12 pice = 1 anna; 16 annas = 1 rupee

Refer 	Indian Native States

Sint Maarten 

Dates 	2010 - 
Capital 	Philipsburg
Currency 	100 cents = 1 gulden (florin)

See also
		Curaçao (Curaçao and Dependencies);
		Netherlands Antilles;

Slesvig 

Dates 	1920 only
Capital 	Schleswig
Currency 	Danish and German used concurrently

Refer 	Plebiscite Issues

Slovakia 

In 1993, the federation of Czechoslovakia was dissolved and Slovakia became an independent republic with
Michal Kovác as its first president.

Dates 	1993 –
Capital 	Bratislava
Currency 	100 haleru = 1 koruna

Main Article Postage stamps and postal history of Slovakia

Includes 	Slovakia (Autonomous State)

See also 	Czechoslovakia;
		Czech Republic

Slovakia (Autonomous State) 

Dates 	1939 – 1945
Capital 	Bratislava
Currency 	100 haleru = 1 koruna

Refer 	Slovakia

Slovenia 

Formerly part of the Austro-Hungarian Empire, Slovenia was combined with other areas in 1918 to form
Yugoslavia.  After occupation by Italy and Germany in WW2, it was returned to Yugoslavia in 1945.
In 1991, Slovenia seceded from the Yugoslav federation and became an independent republic.

Dates 	1991 –
Capital 	Ljubljana
Currency 	euro

Main Article Postage stamps and postal history of Slovenia

Includes 	Slovenia (Provincial Issues);
		Slovenia (Yugoslav Regional Issues)

See also 	Yugoslavia

Slovenia (Provincial Issues) 

Dates 	1919 – 1921
Capital 	Ljubljana
Currency 	100 vinar = 1 krona

Refer 	Slovenia

Slovenia (Yugoslav Regional Issues) 

Dates 	1945 – 1946
Capital 	Ljubljana
Currency 	German, Italian and Hungarian used concurrently

Refer 	Slovenia

Slovenia (German Occupation) 

Refer 	Laibach (German Occupation)

Slovenia (Italian Occupation) 

Refer 	Lubiana (Italian Occupation)

References

Bibliography
 Stanley Gibbons Ltd, Europe and Colonies 1970, Stanley Gibbons Ltd, 1969
 Stanley Gibbons Ltd, various catalogues
 Stuart Rossiter & John Flower, The Stamp Atlas, W H Smith, 1989
 XLCR Stamp Finder and Collector's Dictionary, Thomas Cliffe Ltd, c.1960

External links
 AskPhil – Glossary of Stamp Collecting Terms
 Encyclopaedia of Postal History

Sc